Bill Balas is an American screenwriter, director and producer best known for his work on the A&E series Bates Motel and the TNT series Animal Kingdom.

Early life
Born and raised in Cleveland, Ohio, Balas is a graduate of the American Film Institute, where he earned a MFA in Screenwriting. Prior to moving to Los Angeles, California, he was diagnosed with cystic fibrosis as an infant and underwent a successful double-lung transplant in his early twenties.

Awards
Writers Guild of America, West
 2015 Writer Access Project Honoree (Affliction) 

Slamdance Film Festival
 2010 Teleplay Competition: Original Pilot Winner (Murphy's Last Stand) 

American Screenwriting Competition
 2006 Grand Prize Winner (The Pros and Cons of Breathing) 

International Student Film Festival Hollywood
 2006 Best Horror/Thriller Winner (House of the Rising Sun) 

Alfred P. Sloan Foundation
 2005 Production Award Winner (The Pros and Cons of Breathing)

References

External links

American television writers
American male screenwriters
Living people
Writers from Cleveland
Lung transplant recipients
Writers from Los Angeles
American male television writers
Film directors from Los Angeles
Screenwriters from California
Screenwriters from Ohio
Year of birth missing (living people)